Robertson High School (RHS) is a public senior high school in Las Vegas, New Mexico, United States. The school is part of the Las Vegas City Schools District in former East Las Vegas. The building dates from about 1945, when it was known as Las Vegas High School.  The school was renamed Las Vegas Robertson High School in 1958, after the old Las Vegas High School burned down and a new building was constructed. W. J. Robertson had been the superintendent of the Las Vegas City Schools since 1941 when he suffered a fatal heart attack on November 26, 1956, at the age of 55. Mr. Robertson, born in Kansas on November 3, 1901, also served as principal at Las Vegas High School for many years prior.  The colors of RHS are red and white, their mascot is the Cardinal. The enrollment currently stands at 414.

The attendance boundary of the school district, effectively that of the high school, includes eastern sections of Las Vegas, and Watrous.

Academics

Student body statistics

Athletics

RHS competes in the New Mexico Activities Association, District 2-AAA. Their district includes: Raton High School, St. Michael's High School, Santa Fe Indian School, Santa Fe Preparatory School and West Las Vegas High School.

RHS has won 34 State Championships since 1969.

References

Las Vegas, New Mexico
Public high schools in New Mexico
Buildings and structures in San Miguel County, New Mexico
Educational institutions established in 1958
1958 establishments in New Mexico